The Longevity Project is a 2011 book on the social and psychological characteristics associated with long human longevity. Written by Howard S. Friedman and Leslie R. Martin, the book is based on a 20-year study extending the 60 years of Lewis Terman's Genetic Studies of Genius research.

Bibliography

External links 

 

2011 non-fiction books
English-language books
Longevity